Orlando Cruz (born July 1, 1981) is a Puerto Rican professional boxer. As an amateur, he represented Puerto Rico at the 2000 Olympic Games in Australia.

Biography 
On October 4, 2012, Cruz officially came out in an interview with Jessi Losada from Telemundo. Scholars who studied his coming-out interviews, describe how Cruz’s coming-out process was influenced by factors like homophobia and toxic masculinity as he navigated his masculinity and sexuality in the media. In doing so, he became the first boxer to come out as gay while still active professionally, stating that "I have and will always be a proud Puerto Rican. I have always been and always will be a proud gay man". He won his first fight since coming out on October 20, 2012. He was among the first class of inductees into the National Gay and Lesbian Sports Hall of Fame on August 2, 2013.

In July 2016, Orlando Cruz dedicated his match with Alejandro Valdez to the gay citizens murdered at the Pulse nightclub shooting in Florida. Nearly half the victims were Puerto Rican, and Cruz lost four friends in this tragedy. At the weigh-in for the match, Cruz proudly wore a pair of rainbow-striped briefs, and the bell tolled once for each of the forty-nine victims killed in the shooting.

In an interview with El Vocero, Cruz claimed that he did not plan on retiring anytime soon and told Puerto Rican paper editors about his plans to continue making history. “At 35-years-old—I feel great. I know my opponent will come to fight but I am prepared and ready for victory and then to be crowned world champion. I’m focused on becoming the only gay world champion in boxing history."

Cruz wanted to become the first openly gay world boxing champion, and stated so in multiple interviews. He claimed the WBO North American Boxing Organization super featherweight title, but during the eighth round of World Boxing Organization (WBO) World Lightweight championship match in November 2016, he lost to the undefeated Terry Flanagan. After the fight, UK trainer Peter Fury (who at the time was the trainer of his nephew Tyson Fury) stated in a now-deleted tweet “That’s the difference between real men & half of something else.” Later, after being criticised for his comment, he tweeted “Don't worry about my position. Fighting men I want to see. Not something else! #BOXING” (7:08 PM November 26, 2016). Cruz offered Fury no response, instead tweeting “gracias por tu trato, apoyo y respeto dios te bendiga, de eso se trata caemos nos levantamos con más fuerza” (translation: “thank you for your treatment, support and respect god bless you, that's what it's about we fall we get up stronger”) on November 28, 2016 1:36 PM. Despite this match and its resulting homophobia, the Puerto Rican boxer remains an active LGBTQ fighter.

At the LGBT Ricans Conference at Hunter College, Orlando Cruz revealed the emotional pain he endured when he came out to his father as a teenager. His mother was supportive immediately, but his father was supposedly disgusted and refused to speak with him for a year. After years of tension, his father supposedly regretted his actions, and the Puerto Rican boxer now refers to his father as not only his father but also his best friend. Both his mother and father attended Cruz’s wedding to his partner, Jose Manuel Colon, in Central Park in 2013.

In 2017, Cruz was featured as part of a campaign launched by Lululemon (an athletic apparel company) exploring masculinity and strength through a series of short videos. The ad campaign, titled ‘Strength to Be’, aimed to challenge traditional stereotypes of masculinity by featuring five men touching upon what masculinity and what it means for them. Cruz’s video features him talking about coming out while still being a professional boxer.

During Summer 2018, he was honored as Grand Marshall for the Chicago Pride Parade and “Cacique King” for the People’s Puerto Rican Parade.

Career
Cruz made his professional debut on December 15, 2000, against Alfredo Valdez in Puerto Rico. He was undefeated until 2009, when he lost to Cornelius Lock by TKO. Cruz is currently ranked at No. 4 among featherweights by the World Boxing Organization (WBO).

He has been described by ESPN as having "quick hands and feet" and "moves well and punches in flashy combinations."

Professional record 

| style="text-align:center;" colspan="8"|25 Wins (12 Knockouts), 6 Defeats (3 Knockouts), 1 Draw
|-  style="text-align:center; background:#e3e3e3;"
|  style="border-style:none none solid solid; "|Res.
|  style="border-style:none none solid solid; "|Record
|  style="border-style:none none solid solid; "|Opponent
|  style="border-style:none none solid solid; "|Type
|  style="border-style:none none solid solid; "|Rd., Time
|  style="border-style:none none solid solid; "|Date
|  style="border-style:none none solid solid; "|Location
|  style="border-style:none none solid solid; "|Notes
|- align=center
|style="background:#abcdef;"|Draw
|25–6–2
|align=left| Lamont Roach Jr.
|
|
|
|align=left|
|align=left|
|- align=center
|Loss
|25–6–1
|align=left| José López
|
|
|
|align=left|
|align=left|
|- align=center
|Loss
|25–5–1
|align=left| Terry Flanagan
|
|
|
|align=left|
|align=left|
|- align=center
|Win
|25–4–1
|align=left| Gabino Cota
|
|
|
|align=left|
|align=left|
|- align=center
|Win
|24–4–1
|align=left| Alejandro Valdez
|
|
|
|align=left|
|align=left|
|- align=center
|Win
|23–4–1
|align=left| Romulo Koasicha
|
|
|
|align=left|
|align=left|
|- align=center
|Win
|22–4–1
|align=left| Gabino Cota
|
|
|
|align=left|
|align=left|
|- align=center
|Win
|21–4–1
|align=left| Edwin Lopez
|
|
|
|align=left|
|align=left|
|- align=center
|Loss
|20–4–1
|align=left| Gamalier Rodriguez
|
|
|
|align=left|
|align=left|
|- align=center
|Loss
|20–3–1
|align=left| Orlando Salido
|
|
|
|align=left|
|align=left|
|- align=center
|Win
|20–2–1
|align=left| Aalan Martinez
|
|
|
|align=left|
|align=left|
|- align=center
|Win
|19–2–1
|align=left| Jorge Pazos
|
|
|
|align=left|
|align=left|
|- align=center
|Win
|18–2–1
|align=left| Alejandro Delgado
|
|
|
|align=left|
|align=left|
|- align=center
|Win
|17–2–1
|align=left| Michael Franco
|
|
|
|align=left|
|align=left|
|- align=center
|Loss
|16–2–1
|align=left| Daniel Ponce de León
|
|
|
|align=left|
|align=left|
|- align=center
|Loss
|16–1–1
|align=left| Cornelius Lock
|
|
|
|align=left|
|align=left|
|- align=center
|Win
|16–0–1
|align=left| Leonilo Miranda
|
|
|
|align=left|
|align=left|
|- align=center
|Win
|15–0–1
|align=left| Carlos Guevara
|
|
|
|align=left|
|align=left|
|- align=center
|Win
|14–0–1
|align=left| Wilfredo Acuna
|
|
|
|align=left|
|align=left|
|- align=center
|style="background:#abcdef;"|Draw
|13–0–1
|align=left| Jesús Salvador Pérez
|
|
|
|align=left|
|align=left|
|- align=center
|Win
|13–0
|align=left| Armando Córdoba
|
|
|
|align=left|
|align=left|
|- align=center
|Win
|12–0
|align=left| Ricardo Medina
|
|
|
|align=left|
|align=left|
|- align=center
|Win
|11–0
|align=left| Francisco Huerta
|
|
|
|align=left|
|align=left|
|- align=center
|Win
|10–0
|align=left| Juan Ramón Cruz
|
|
|
|align=left|
|align=left|
|- align=center
|Win
|9–0
|align=left| Ricardo Barrera
|
|
|
|align=left|
|align=left|
|- align=center
|Win
|8–0
|align=left| Pedro Rincón Miranda
|
|
|
|align=left|
|align=left|
|- align=center
|Win
|7–0
|align=left| Osvaldo Cedeño
|
|
|
|align=left|
|align=left|
|- align=center
|Win
|6–0
|align=left| Michael Connolly
|
|
|
|align=left|
|align=left|
|- align=center
|Win
|5–0
|align=left| Javier Hernández
|
|
|
|align=left|
|align=left|
|- align=center
|Win
|4–0
|align=left| Alberto Cepeda
|
|
|
|align=left|
|align=left|
|- align=center
|Win
|3–0
|align=left| Willie Thomas
|
|
|
|align=left|
|align=left|
|- align=center
|Win
|2–0
|align=left| Eugenio Ventura
|
|
|
|align=left|
|align=left|
|- align=center
|Win
|1–0
|align=left| Alfredo Valdez
|
|
|
|align=left|
|align=left|

See also

List of Puerto Rican boxing world champions

References

Living people
1981 births
Boxers at the 2000 Summer Olympics
LGBT boxers
Olympic boxers of Puerto Rico
Gay sportsmen
People from Yabucoa, Puerto Rico
Puerto Rican male boxers
Puerto Rican LGBT sportspeople
Lightweight boxers
Inductees of the National Gay and Lesbian Sports Hall of Fame